TSS Sir Walter Raleigh was a passenger tender vessel built for the Great Western Railway in 1908.

History

TSS Sir Walter Raleigh was built by Cammell Laird as one of a pair of vessels, with TSS Sir Francis Drake. She was on trial in the Mersey during April 1908.

She was hired to the Admiralty as a tug from 1914 to 1919.

In August 1939 she was again taken on by the Admiralty but operated from Plymouth. She was damaged during an air raid on 15 December 1940 when 8 crew were injured.

In 1942 alterations were made to her superstructure for use as a mining tender.

She returned to the GWR at the end of 1945 but the following year was sold and found use with various salvage operators until cut up in 1968.

References

1908 ships
Passenger ships of the United Kingdom
Steamships of the United Kingdom
Ships built on the River Mersey
Ships of the Great Western Railway